José Antonio Dias Toffoli (born November 15, 1967) is a Brazilian lawyer who has been a member of the Supreme Federal Court of Brazil since 2009, nominated by President Luiz Inácio Lula da Silva. Toffoli was the president of the Supreme Federal Court for the 2018–20 term.

Biography
José Dias Toffoli was born in Marília, São Paulo in 1967, the son of Luiz Toffoli and Sebastiana Seixas Dias Toffoli. He attended the law school of the University of São Paulo from 1986 to 1990, graduating with a bachelor's degree in law. While in college, Toffoli presided the student union. From 1996 to 2002 he was a professor of constitutional and family law at Centro Universitário de Brasília.

In 1994 and 1995 Toffoli took examinations for a position as a judge in the state of São Paulo, but was twice rejected. Toffoli was then the legal representative for the Workers' Party (PT) in the presidential campaigns of Luiz Inácio Lula da Silva in 1998, 2002 and 2006.

From March 2001 to December 2002 Toffoli was a co-owner of the law firm Toffoli & Telesca Advogados, and from 2005 to 2007 co-owned the firm Toffoli & Rangel Advogados. In 2007, Toffoli was appointed Attorney General of Brazil by President Lula.

Supreme Court nomination
On 17 September 2009 President Lula nominated Dias Toffoli, then his Attorney General of Brazil, for the Supreme Federal Court seat vacated by the death of Justice Carlos Alberto Menezes Direito two weeks prior. Upon his nomination, Toffoli resigned as Attorney General, and was replaced by Evandro Costa Gama.

After being confirmed by the Senate to the Supreme Court, Toffoli took his seat as Justice on 23 October 2009, aged 41. He was, at the time, the youngest person to become Supreme Court justice since 1988, and remains as one of the youngest people to enter the court. He was the eighth Supreme Court nomination by President Lula.

Presidency of the Supreme Federal Court 
On 13 September 2018, Toffoli succeeded Justice Carmen Lúcia as the president of the Supreme Federal Court. The court's vice president in this term is Luiz Fux.

Odebrecht report 
In April 2019 the Crusoé magazine reported that a document from Operation Car Wash reveals that then-Solicitor General Toffoli was involved in the Odebrecht scandal, according to the company's former chairman Marcelo Odebrecht. On 15 April STF justice Alexandre de Moraes ordered that Crusoé take down the article from their website. Toffoli himself later requested a probe into whether Crusoé illegally leaked the document. The Court's decision on the matter was criticized by outlets such as The Intercept on the basis of censorship and attack on the freedom of the press.

References

1967 births
Living people
Supreme Federal Court of Brazil justices
20th-century Brazilian lawyers
University of São Paulo alumni
People from Marília
Vaza Jato
21st-century Brazilian judges
Attorneys General of Brazil